The following outline is provided as an overview of and topical guide to computer engineering:

Computer engineering – discipline that integrates several fields of electrical engineering and computer science required to  develop computer hardware and software. Computer engineers usually have training in electronic engineering (or electrical engineering), software design, and hardware-software integration instead of only software engineering or electronic engineering. Computer engineers are involved in many hardware and software aspects of computing, from the design of individual microcontrollers, microprocessors, personal computers, and supercomputers, to circuit design. This field of engineering not only focuses on how computer systems themselves work, but also how they integrate into the larger picture.

Main articles on computer engineering 

 Computer
 Computer architecture
 Computer hardware
 Computer software
 Computer science
 Engineering
 Electrical engineering
 Software engineering

History of computer engineering

General 

 Time line of computing 2400 BC - 1949 - 1950-1979 - 1980-1989 - 1990-1999 - 2000-2009 
 History of computing hardware up to third generation (1960s)
 History of computing hardware from 1960s to current
 History of computer hardware in Eastern Bloc countries
 History of personal computers
 History of laptops
 History of software engineering
 History of compiler writing
 History of the Internet
 History of the World Wide Web
 History of video games
 History of the graphical user interface
 Timeline of computing
 Timeline of operating systems
 Timeline of programming languages
 Timeline of artificial intelligence
 Timeline of cryptography 
 Timeline of algorithms
 Timeline of quantum computing

Product specific  
 Timeline of DOS operating systems 
 Classic Mac OS 
 History of macOS 
 History of Microsoft Windows
 Timeline of Apple II family
 Timeline of Apple products
 Timeline of file sharing
 Timeline of OpenBSD

Hardware 
 Digital electronics
 Very-large-scale integration
 Hardware description language
 Application-specific integrated circuit
 Electrical network
 Microprocessor

Software 
 Assembly language
 Operating system
 Database
 Software engineering

System design 
 Computer architecture
 Microarchitecture
 Multiprocessing
 Computer performance by orders of magnitude

Interdisciplinary fields 
 Human–computer interaction
 Computer network
 Digital signal processing
 Control theory

See also 
 Computer Science
 List of basic information technology topics

References

External links 

 Computer Engineering at The Princeton Review
 Computer Engineering Conference Calendar

Computer engineering
Computer engineering

Computer engineering topics, basic